Humeral spot (from Latin humerus, pertaining to the shoulder) is a mark or pattern found on several species of fish, typically above the pectoral fin. 

In insects, the humeral spot may be found on the costal area of the wing.

References

Humerus
Fish physiology
Insect physiology